Giovannino Oliviero Giuseppe Guareschi (1 May 1908 – 22 July 1968) was an Italian journalist, cartoonist and humorist whose best known creation is the priest Don Camillo.

Life and career
Giovannino Guareschi was born into a middle-class family in Fontanelle di Roccabianca, Province of Parma, in 1908. He always joked about the fact that he, a big man, was baptized Giovannino, a name meaning "little John" or "Johnny".

In 1926 his family went bankrupt and he could not continue his studies at the University of Parma. After working at various minor jobs, he started to write for a local newspaper, the Gazzetta di Parma. In 1929 he became editor of the satirical magazine Corriere Emiliano, and from 1936 to 1943 he was the chief editor of a similar magazine called Bertoldo.

In 1943 he was drafted into the army, which apparently helped him to avoid trouble with the Italian Fascist authorities. He ended up as an artillery officer.

When Italy signed an armistice with the Allies in 1943, he was arrested as an Italian military internee and imprisoned with other Italian soldiers in camps in German-occupied Poland for almost two years, including at Stalag X-B near Sandbostel. He later wrote about this period in Diario Clandestino (My Secret Diary).

After the war Guareschi returned to Italy and in 1945 founded a monarchist weekly satirical magazine, Candido. After Italy became a republic, he supported the Democrazia Cristiana party. He criticized and satirized the Communists in his magazine, famously drawing a Communist as a man with an extra nostril, and coining a slogan that became very popular: "Inside the voting booth God can see you, Stalin can't." When the Communists were defeated in the 1948 Italian general election, Guareschi did not put his pen down but also criticized the Democrazia Cristiana party.

In 1950, Candido published a satirical cartoon by Carlo Manzoni poking fun at Luigi Einaudi, President of the Republic. The President is at the Quirinal Palace, surrounded by, instead of the presidential guard of honour (the corazzieri), giant bottles of Nebbiolo wine, which Einaudi actually produced on his land in Dogliani. Each bottle was labeled with the institutional logo. The cartoon was judged 'in Contempt of the President' by a court at the time. Guareschi, as the director of the magazine, was held responsible and sentenced.

In 1954 Guareschi was charged with libel after he published two facsimile wartime letters from resistance leader and former Prime Minister Alcide De Gasperi requesting that the Allies bomb the outskirts of Rome in order to demoralize German collaborators. The legitimacy of the letters was never established by the court, but after a two-month trial it found in favour of De Gasperi.  Guareschi declined to appeal the verdict and spent 409 days in Parma's San Francesco jail, and another six months on probation at his home.

His most famous comic creations are his short stories, begun in the late 1940s, about the rivalry between Don Camillo, a stalwart Italian priest, and the equally hot-headed Peppone, Communist mayor of a Po River Valley village in the "Little World." These stories were dramatized on radio, television and in films, most notably in the series of films featuring Fernandel as Don Camillo.

By 1956 Guareschi's health had deteriorated and he began spending time in Switzerland for treatment. In 1957 he retired as editor of Candido but remained a contributor.

He died in Cervia in 1968 of a heart attack, at age 60.

Selected bibliography
La scoperta di Milano (1941)
Il destino si chiama Clotilde (1943)
Il marito in collegio (1944)
Favola di natale (1945)
Diario Clandestino 1943-1945 (1946)
Italia Provvisoria (1947)
Lo zibaldino (1948)
Corrierino delle famiglie (1954)
Vita in famiglia (1968)

Published English translations
 The Little World of Don Camillo (1950)
 Don Camillo and his Flock (in USA); Don Camillo and the Prodigal Son (in UK) (1952)
 The House That Nino Built (1953)
 Don Camillo's Dilemma (1954)
 Don Camillo Takes the Devil by the Tail (in USA); Don Camillo and the Devil (in UK)  (1957)
 My Secret Diary (1958)
 Comrade Don Camillo (1964)
 My Home, Sweet Home (1966)
 A Husband in a Boarding School (1967)
 Duncan & Clotilda: An Extravaganza with a Long Digression (1968)
 Don Camillo Meets the Flower Children (in USA); Don Camillo Meets Hell's Angels (in UK) (1969)
 The Family Guareschi: Chronicles of the Past and Present (1970)

Pilot Productions authorised complete English-language edition of Don Camillo stories

The Guareschi family only discovered after 1980 that the original English language publishers made unauthorised cuts in the Don Camillo stories, and only published 132 of the original 347 Italian stories. After an approach from Piers Dudgeon of Pilot Productions, the family authorised him to publish uncut translations into English of all the original 347 stories. The copyright is vested in the family, and the books published so far are:

 No. 1: The Complete Little World of Don Camillo (2013) 
 No. 2: Don Camillo and His Flock (2015) 
 No. 3: Don Camillo and Peppone (2016) 
 No. 4: Comrade Don Camillo (2017) 
 No. 5: Don Camillo and Company (2018) 
 No. 6: Don Camillo’s Dilemma (2019) 
 No. 7: Don Camillo Takes the Devil by the Tail (2020) 
 No. 8: Don Camillio and Don Chichi (2021) 
 No. 9: Merry Christmas Don Camillo (2022)

Filmography
La rabbia, 1963. Co-director with Pier Paolo Pasolini.

Filmography about Don Camillo
Little World of Don Camillo - Don Camillo (1952)
The Return of Don Camillo - Il ritorno di Don Camillo (1953)
Don Camillo's Last Round - Don Camillo e l'onorevole Peppone (1955)
Don Camillo: Monsignor - Don Camillo Monsignore... ma non troppo! (1961)
Don Camillo in Moscow - Il compagno Don Camillo (1965)
Don Camillo and the today's youth - Don Camillo e i giovani d'oggi (1970), unfinished project
Don Camillo and the today's youth - Don Camillo e i giovani d'oggi (1972)
The World of Don Camillo - Don Camillo (1983), remake by Terence Hill and Colin Blakely

Notes

References

External links

Tutto il mondo di Guareschi (Official Site)
A review of Little World of Don Camillo at Open Letters Monthly
World of Giovannino Guareschi
Virtual Travel in the Little World of Guareschi

1908 births
1968 deaths
20th-century Italian novelists
20th-century Italian male writers
Italian anti-communists
Writers from the Province of Parma
University of Parma alumni
Italian male short story writers
Italian satirists
Italian illustrators
Italian monarchists
Italian military personnel of World War II
Bancarella Prize winners
Italian male novelists
20th-century Italian short story writers
Italian male non-fiction writers
Italian magazine founders
Christian novelists
Italian caricaturists